Ocie Lee Smith (June 21, 1932 – November 23, 2001), known professionally as O. C. Smith,  was an American singer.  His recording of "Little Green Apples" went to number 2 on the Billboard Hot 100 in 1968 and sold over one million records.

Biography
Born in Mansfield, Louisiana, United States, Smith moved with his parents to Little Rock, Arkansas, and then moved with his mother to Los Angeles, California after his parents' divorce.

After completing a psychology degree at Southern University, Smith joined the Air Force, and served throughout the U.S., Europe and Asia. While in the Air Force, Smith began entering talent contests and toured with Horace Heidt. After his discharge in July 1955, Smith went into jazz music to pay the bills.

Smith gained his first break as a singer with Sy Oliver and made an appearance on Arthur Godfrey's Talent Scouts. His success on that show led to a 1955 recording contract with Cadence Records where his 1956 debut release "Slow Walk"/"Forbidden Fruit" and three further Cadence singles were not hits.

Smith was also in demand elsewhere as vocalist and under-billed on Art Mooney's Jan 1956 MGM cover version of the Little Richard hit "Tutti Frutti". The release was not a hit, but convinced MGM Records to sign Smith to a solo contract, resulting in three more releases, but still no hits.

In 1961, Smith was recruited by Count Basie to be his vocalist, a position he held until 1965. He also continued to record with different labels, but a hit remained elusive. By 1968, Smith's then label, Columbia Records, was ready to release him from his recording contract, when he entered the charts for the first time with "The Son of Hickory Holler's Tramp", which reached number 2 in the UK Singles Chart and also broke the Top 40 in the United States. In 1976, Kenny Rogers revived the hit as a country song, similar to the first versions of the song by Johnny Darrell.

Smith changed the first part of his name to O.C. and recorded the Bobby Russell-written song "Little Green Apples," which went to number 2 on the Hot 100 on 26 October 1968 and won Russell the 1969 Grammy Award for Song of the Year.  It received a gold record from the R.I.A.A. for sales of one million records.

He continued to record, reaching the R&B, Adult Contemporary and pop charts in his home country with the likes of "Daddy's Little Man", "Friend, Lover, Woman, Wife", "Me and You" and "Love To Burn".  He also returned to the UK Singles Chart in 1977 with "Together", reaching a Top 30 position.

After CBS, Smith united with Charles Wallert, who wrote and produced the title track as well as the album for "Dreams Come True" that returned Smith to the national charts. The Whatcha Gonna Do album, resulted in three nationally charted singles for a total of 40 weeks. This album contained "Brenda", "You're My First, My Last My Everything" and "Spark Of Love". Additional hits "The Best Out Of Me" and "After All Is Said And Done" established Smith as a Beach Music star. Nominated for six awards at the third Beach Music Awards, Smith captured five.

Smith became pastor and founder of The City Of Angels Church in Los Angeles, California  where he ministered for 16 years. One of his last recordings, "Save The Last Dance For Me" reached the number one position on the Rhythm n' Beach Top 40 chart.

Death
On November 23, 2001, Smith died of a heart attack in Los Angeles.

He was survived by his wife Robbie Gholson Smith, his four children with former wife Lorraine Smith: Sherryn Smith, Ocie Lee Smith III, Kelly T. Smith and Robert Francis Smith, sons Jesse Hayes IV and Frank Hayes, daughter Bonnie Dykes, and 10 grandchildren including Monique Smith, Sergio Glenn Smith and Melany Frances Smith.

Shortly after his death, Governor Jim Hodges proclaimed June 21, 2002, "O.C. Smith Day" in the state of South Carolina. Smith was posthumously elected to the Carolina Beach Music Hall of Fame in November 2002.

His book, Little Green Apples: God Really Did Make Them, that he co-wrote with James Shaw, was published posthumously in 2003.

Discography

Singles

Albums
 1966  The Dynamic O.C. Smith
 1968  Hickory Holler Revisited
 1969  O.C. Smith at Home
 1969  For Once in My Life
 1970  Greatest Hits
 1971  Help Me Make It through the Night
 1974  La La Peace Song
 1977  Together
 1979  Love Is Forever
 1980  Dreams Come True	 	
 1982  Love Changes
 1993  After All Is Said and Done
 2000  I Give My Heart to You
 2000  Beach Music Classics and Love Songs

Filmography
 2009  O.C. Smith: How Sweet It Is

References

External links
An in-depth feature with a complete discography at Soulexpress.net

1932 births
2001 deaths
Musicians from Little Rock, Arkansas
Southern University alumni
American clergy
Cadence Records artists
Columbia Records artists
20th-century American singers
Singers from Arkansas
20th-century African-American male singers
American jazz singers
American soul singers
Singers from Los Angeles
American rhythm and blues singers
Jazz musicians from California
Jazz musicians from Arkansas
20th-century American male singers
American male jazz musicians
20th-century American clergy